Shane Codd (born 1987) is an Irish DJ and record producer signed to Polydor Records. He is known for his song "Get Out My Head", which reached the top 10 in Ireland and the UK in January 2021.

Early and personal life
Codd was born in Dublin but moved to Bailieborough, County Cavan aged 11. He is now based in London where he lives in an apartment overlooking The O2 Arena.

He currently studies business and Irish at Dublin City University, however, he had to put this on hold due to the breakthrough of his single "Get Out My Head".

Career
His musical influences are dance music of the 1990s and 2000s and also EDM artists like Avicii and Swedish House Mafia.

In the 2018 Breakout Producer competition held by Mark McCabe, Shane was a finalist and has had his music aired on Irish station SPIN 1038. He has performed in cities and towns across Ireland.

His debut single "Get Out My Head" was released in May 2020. It was first released on SoundCloud, where it got the attention of Polydor Records, who signed him soon after. The song peaked at number five on the Irish Singles Chart and number six on the UK Singles Chart. The song also reached number 2 on The Official Big Top 40.

In December 2020, Codd reached the top spot on the Music Moves Europe Talent Chart with "Get Out My Head" and remained there for three weeks. In the same month, he also released a video for "Get Out My Head".

Discography

Singles

Remixes

References

External links
 

Living people
1997 births
Irish DJs
DJs from Dublin (city)
Irish producers
Polydor Records artists